Below is a list of aircraft currently in active service with the Pakistan Air Force.
 

|-
! Aircraft
! Manufacturer
! Origin
! Class
! Role
! Introduced
! data-sort-type="number" | In service
! Total
! Notes
|-
! style="align: center; background: lavender;" colspan="9" | Combat Aircraft
|-
|J-10C Vigorous Dragon
|CAC 
| 
||Jet
||Multirole 
|4 March 2022
|14 
|14
|22 on order, 72 planned in total
|-
|JF-17 Thunder
|PAC, CAC
|
|Jet
|Multirole
|18 February 2010
|134
|138
|JF-17A Block 1 (50) (to be upgraded to Block 2 standard)

JF-17A Block 2 (62)

JF-17B Block 2 (26)

JF-17C Block 3 (50 on order)

|-
|F-16 Fighting Falcon
|General Dynamics / Lockheed Martin
|
|Jet
||Multirole
|15 January 1983
|75
|85
|F-16A Block 15 MLU (37)

F-16B Block 15 MLU (17)

F-16A Block 15 ADF (9)

F-16B Block 15 ADF (4)

F-16C Block 52+ (12)

F-16D Block 52+ (6)
|-
|Mirage III
|Dassault
|
| Jet
| Multirole
| 8 March 1968
|87
|135
| Several variants with extensive Project ROSE upgrades. All Mirage IIIs are planned to be replaced by JF-17s.
|-
|Mirage 5
|Dassault
|
|Jet
| Attack, Reconnaissance
| 1970
| 92
| 139
| Several variants with extensive Project ROSE upgrades. All Mirage 5s are planned to be replaced by JF-17s.
|-
|F-7PG Skybolt
|CAC
|
|Jet
| Interceptor
| 2002
| 53
| 60
| 
All F-7PGs/FT-7PGs are planned to be replaced by Block 3 JF-17Cs.
|-
   
|-
! style="align: center; background: lavender;" colspan="9" | Trainer Aircraft
|-
|Karakorum-8 (K-8)
|Hongdu,PAC
|
| Jet
| Intermediate Jet Trainer
| 1994
|60
|60
|K-8 (12)

K-8P (48) 
|- 
|T-37 Tweet
|Cessna
|
| Jet
| Basic Jet Trainer
| 1962
|69
|73
||T-37B/C. 20 refurbished ex-USAF T-37 delivered by end of 2008 to replace older T-37 or provide parts. T-37 to be eventually replaced with K-8P. On 28 October 2015, the Turkish Air Force transferred 34 T-37Cs to the PAF, including spares.
|-
| MFI-17 Mushshak
| PAC
| 
| Propeller
| Primary Trainer
| 1974
| 145
| 151
| MFI-17 Mushshak (115)
 
Super Mushshak (30)
 
Some MFI-17 Mushshaks to be upgraded to Super Mushshak standard.
|-
! style="align: center; background: lavender;" colspan="9" | Strategic Airlift & Aerial Refueling Aircraft
|-
|Il-78
|Ilyushin
|
| Jet
| Strategic Airlift Transporter/Aerial Refueler || 2009 || 4 || 4
| Il-78MP. Dual-role aerial refeulers and freighters. Ex-Ukrainian Air Force.
|-
! style="align: center; background: lavender;" colspan="9" | Transport Aircraft
|-
|C-130 Hercules
|Lockheed Martin
|
| Propeller
| Tactical Airlift Transporter || 1963 ||16 ||25
| C-130B (5)

C-130E (7)

C-130H (6)

7 C-130H on order.

All C-130s overhauled and upgraded by PAC.
|-
|Saab 2000
|Saab
|
| Propeller
| Transport, Training || 2008 || 6 || 6
| Will also be used to train aircrew for the Saab 2000 Erieye AEW&C. Delivered in December 2008.
|-
| CN-235
| CASA
|
| Propeller
| Transport || 2004 || 4 
| 4
| CN-235-220. 3 medium lift transporters. 1 VIP transporter.
|-
|Y-12
|Harbin
|
| Propeller
| Utility || 1993 || 2 || 2
| Y-12II
|-
| Airbus A310
| Airbus
|
| Jet
| VIP Transport || 2009 || 1 || 1
| A310-300. Previously operated by PIA.
|-
|Boeing 707
|Boeing
|
| Jet
| VIP Transport || 1986 || 2 || 3
| 707-320. Two transferred from PIA in 1986. A third aircraft in VIP transport configuration delivered in 1987. One aircraft sold to a private individual in 2008.
|-
|Citation V
|Cessna
|
| Jet
| VIP Transport || || 1 || 1
|
|-
|Gulfstream IV
|Gulfstream
|
| Jet
| VIP Transport || 2004 || 4 || 4
|
|-
|Phenom 100
|Embraer
|
| Jet
| VIP Transport || 2009 || 4 || 4
|
|-
! style="align: center; background: lavender;" colspan="9" | Airborne Early Warning & Control Aircraft
|-
|ZDK-03 Karakoram Eagle
|Shaanxi
|
| Propeller
| AEW&C || 2011 || 4 || 4
| | Developed specifically for the PAF, the ZDK-03 is a modified version of the Shaanxi Y-8F600 medium range transport aircraft with a Chinese AESA radar and radome mounted on top of the aircraft. Last two ZDK-03s were delivered in 2013.
|-
|Saab 2000 Erieye
|Saab
|
| Propeller
| AEW&C || 2011 || 7 || 8 || Saab 2000 equipped with the Saab Erieye AEW&C system. Three aircraft were damaged after Minhas airbase attack, of which two aircraft were repaired at PAC. Three more aircraft delivered in 2019. One aircraft lost until date.
|-
! style="align: center; background: lavender;" colspan="9" | Electronic Warfare Aircraft
|-
| Falcon DA-20
| Dassault
| 
| Jet
| EW, ESM, ECM || 1986 || 3 || 3
| Modified electroonic warfare version of the Dassault Falcon 20 business jet.
|-
! style="align: center; background: lavender;" colspan="9" | Unmanned Aerial Vehicles
|-
| Burraq
| NESCOM
|
| UCAV, UAV
| Reconnaissance, Strike || 2014 || 13
|13|| Inducted in November 2014. Used jointly with Pakistan Army.
|-
|Shahpar-2
|GIDS
|
| UCAV, UAV
| Reconnaissance, Strike || 2021 || Unknown
|Unknown|| Currently in production.
|-
|Anka
|TAI, NESCOM
|
| UCAV, UAV
| Reconnaissance, Strike || 2021 || Unknown
|Unknown|| Contract signed between TAI and NESCOM in August 2021 for joint production of Anka UCAVs with technology transfer to Pakistan. 
|-
|Bayraktar TB2
|Baykar
|
| UCAV, UAV
| Reconnaissance, Strike || 2021 || Unknown
|Unknown|| Operationalized in January 2022.
|-
| Bayraktar Akıncı 
| Baykar 
|
| UCAV, UAV
| Reconnaissance, Strike || 2022 || Unknown
|Unknown||Plan to operate after 2023.
|-
| Wing Loong II
| CAIG
|
| UCAV, UAV
| Reconnaissance, Strike || 2020 || 50
|50|| 
|-
|Rainbow
|CASC
|
| UCAV, UAV
| Reconnaissance, Strike || 2021 || 12-24
|12-24|| CH-4A and CH-4B variants in service.
|-
|Jasoos II
|SATUMA
|
| UAV
| Reconnaissance, Training || 2010 || 46
|46|| Bravo+. Primary work horse for UAV Operations and Training Program.
|-
|Falco
|Selex ES,PAC
|
| UAV
| Reconnaissance || 2007 || 26
|26|| PAF was launch customer for the Falco UAV in 2007. Manufactured under license at PAC since 2008 with technology transfer to Pakistan.
|-
|Shahpar
|GIDS
|
| UAV
| Reconnaissance || 2012 || 6
|6|| In service and in production. 
|-
! style="align: center; background: lavender;" colspan="9" | Helicopters
|-
| Mi-17
| Mil
|
| Helicopter
| Transport, Utility || 2010 || 40 ||
|
|-
| AW139
| AgustaWestland
|
| Helicopter
| SAR, Utility || 2018 || 14 || 14
| AW139M (14)
|}

See also
List of retired Pakistan Air Force aircraft
List of Pakistan Air Force Squadrons
Pakistan Army Aviation Corps
Pakistan Naval Air Arm

References

External links
 Pakistan Air Force – official website

Pakistan Air Force Aircraft
Aircraft
Air Force Aircraft

AirForce